"No Name" is a song by Irish singer-songwriter Ryan O'Shaughnessy, released on 5 August 2012 as the lead single from his extended play Ryan O'Shaughnessy (2012). The song entered the Irish Singles Chart at number 3 and the UK Singles Chart at number 31.

He performed it initially as an audition in 2012 during season 6 of Britain's Got Talent. He said it was his own words and composition and he had chosen this song as it meant so much to him. He explained it was about his "best mate" for six years ever since he was thirteen. However he refused to name the person despite persistent questions about the name by the three member jury consisting of David Walliam, Simon Cowell and Alesha Dixon. He finished in fifth place during the competition.

Music video
A music video to accompany the release of "No Name" was first released onto YouTube on 18 June 2012 at a total length of two minutes and fifty-one seconds.

Track listing

Chart performance

Release history

References

Ryan O'Shaughnessy songs
2012 singles
2012 songs
Sony Music singles